Michael John Blyzka (December 25, 1928 – October 13, 2004) was a pitcher in Major League Baseball who played for the St. Louis Browns / Baltimore Orioles (–). He served in the U.S. Army during World War II.

In a two-season-career, Blyzka posted a 3–11 record with 58 strikeouts and a 5.58 ERA in 70 appearances, including nine start, one save, and 180⅓ innings of work.

Before the 1955 season, in the largest transaction in major league history, Baltimore sent Blyzka along Jim Fridley, Billy Hunter, Darrell Johnson, Dick Kryhoski, Don Larsen and Bob Turley to the Yankees, in exchange for Harry Byrd, Don Leppert, Jim McDonald, Bill Miller, Willy Miranda, Kal Segrist, Hal Smith, Gus Triandos, Gene Woodling and Ted Del Guercio.

External links 

 Retrosheet
 The Deadball Era
 Mike Blyzka at SABR (Baseball BioProject)

References 

1928 births
2004 deaths
Baseball players from Michigan
Major League Baseball pitchers
St. Louis Browns players
Baltimore Orioles players
United States Army personnel of World War II
Denver Bears players
Springfield Giants (Ohio) players
Belleville Stags players
Wichita Indians players
Madisonville Miners players
Marshall Browns players
Lima Terriers players
Minneapolis Millers (baseball) players